Scopula haematophaga is a moth of the family Geometridae. It was described by Hans Bänziger and David Stephen Fletcher in 1985. It is found in northern Thailand, south-western China, north-western Malaysia and north-western Indonesia.

References

Moths described in 1985
Moths of Asia
haematophaga